Arthur Rogers (born 26 September 1996) is an English professional footballer who plays as a midfielder for USL League One club Northern Colorado Hailstorm.

Career

Youth
Rogers spent time with both Hanwell Town and Wealdstone, as well as have trials with clubs such as QPR, Brentford, Watford, and Fulham.

College and amateur
In 2016, Rogers opted to move to the United States to play college soccer at Kentucky Wesleyan College. After a successful first season with the Panthers, he transferred to the University of Texas Rio Grande Valley, where he played for three seasons, making a total of 45 appearances, scoring 3 goals and tallying 10 assists, and was named All-WAC Second Team, as well as the United Soccer Coaches Scholar All-West Region Second Team.

While at college, Rogers also appeared in the USL League Two for Corpus Christi FC.

Professional

On 23 December 2019, Rogers signed his professional contract with USL Championship side Hartford Athletic ahead of their 2020 season. He made his debut on 17 July 2020, appearing as a 67th-minute substitute during a 1–0 win over New York Red Bulls II. Rogers appeared in 16 of Hartford's 17 matches for the 2020 USL season and on 14 December 2020 he re signed with Hartford for the 2021 season.

On 24 March 2022, it was announced Rogers had joined USL League One club Northern Colorado Hailstorm ahead of their inaugural season. At the end of the season, Rogers was voted the 2022 USL League One Defender of the Year.

References

External links

Kentucky Wesleyan bio
UTRGV bio

1996 births
Association football midfielders
English expatriate footballers
English expatriate sportspeople in the United States
English footballers
Expatriate soccer players in the United States
Hartford Athletic players
Living people
UT Rio Grande Valley Vaqueros men's soccer players
USL Championship players
USL League Two players
Corpus Christi FC players
Northern Colorado Hailstorm FC players